Raya Airways Sdn Bhd (doing business as Raya Airways) is a cargo airline with its head office in the Raya Airways Centre in the Cargo Complex of Sultan Abdul Aziz Shah Airport in Subang, Selangor, Malaysia.

It is an express freight and freighter charter company.  The airline was established in November 1993 as Transmile Air.  It has courier transportation services between Peninsular Malaysia and East Malaysia and services international companies such as DHL Express, United Parcel Service, Air Macau and CEN Worldwide, among others.  Raya Airways also provides aircraft charters and wet leases specialists with experience operating cargo flights around the world.  Raya Airways was designated a National Cargo Carrier by the Malaysian Transport Ministry in 1996.

History

Raya Airways began its operations as Transmile Air Services with one Boeing 737 and one Cessna Grand Caravan in providing air express
transport service to Pos Malaysia Berhad for their courier business to East Malaysia in November 1993.  It later developed into an international company and the only dedicated intra-Asian overnight express cargo operator in Malaysia.  Their first Boeing 727 freighter service commenced in 2000 for the Kuala Lumpur/Penang-Bangkok-Hong Kong courier sector.  It was an extended operation for their existing client, DHL International Limited. Over five years, owing to the increasing demand of freight services in the region, Transmile Air Services increased its Boeing 727 fleet to 10. As part of the strategy to expand its operations and network of connecting routes, Transmile Air Services acquired four MD-11s in 2005. They started the MD-11 operation for Kuala Lumpur-Hong Kong-Los Angeles sector in the third quarter of 2005.

From 2002 to 2006, Transmile Air Services provided air cargo service to Air Macau. In 2014, the Airline was rebranded as Raya Airways. Their subsidiaries are K-Mile Air of Thailand and now-defunct Megantara Air of Indonesia, both of which operated aircraft transferred from their fleet.

Fleet 

The Raya Airways fleet consists of the following aircraft (as of December 2022):

Destinations

China
 Nanning – Nanning Wuxu International Airport

Malaysia
 Kota Kinabalu – Kota Kinabalu International Airport
 Kuala Lumpur – Sultan Abdul Aziz Shah Airport Hub
 Kuching – Kuching International Airport
 Labuan – Labuan Airport
 [Tawau, Malaysia] – Tawau Airport

Hong Kong
 Hong Kong – Hong Kong International Airport

Indonesia
 Jakarta – Soekarno-Hatta International Airport

Singapore
 Singapore – Changi Airport

Vietnam
 Ho Chi Minh City – Tan Son Nhat International Airport

References

External links

Airlines established in 1993
Airlines of Malaysia
Cargo airlines of Malaysia
1993 establishments in Malaysia
Privately held companies of Malaysia